Turakovo is a rural locality (a village) in Denisovskoye Rural Settlement, Gorokhovetsky District, Vladimir Oblast, Russia. The population was 26 as of 2010.

Geography 
Turakovo is located 32 km southwest of Gorokhovets (the district's administrative centre) by road. Denisovo is the nearest rural locality.

References 

Rural localities in Gorokhovetsky District